Ana Claudia Talancón (born Ana Claudia Talancón Ortiz Tirado; 1 May 1980), is a Mexican actress, TV host, and philanthropist. She first started acting in her home town, Cancún, Quintana Roo.

Early life and career 
Talancón first started studying acting in Cancún with the Cuban professor Albio Paz. She later went to Mexico City to continue her studies at the Acting Workshop of Héctor Mendoza and Raúl Quintanilla. Since then, she has starred in various soap operas such as Al norte del Corazón, Señora and Amor Latino Romántica obsesión for which she won the Sol de Oro award in 1999 for Best New Actress.

Talancón's big-screen acting debut was with the film El Cometa by Marisa Sistach, playing the character Valentina, for which she was nominated for the Ariel award for Best New Actress. Her biggest role was alongside Gael García Bernal in El Crimen del Padre Amaro (2002) in the role of Amelia, a girl who is impregnated by a Catholic priest and then dies after a backstreet abortion.

Career 
In 2006, Talancón appeared in Richard Linklater's Fast Food Nation as Coco, a Mexican immigrant forced to work in a meatpacking plant. In the same year, she starred in the big-screen film Alone with Her as the main character. She appeared in other movies such as The Virgin of Juarez, in which she received the award for the Best Supporting Actress at the BendFilm Festival and Mujer Albastrina.

Talancón mostly spent time filming big screen films such as Love in the Time of Cholera and El Ultimo Justo, rather than Latin soap operas.
One year later in 2008, she starred in One Missed Call, which was nominated at the Teen Choice Awards, Tear This Heart Out (Arráncame la Vida) and Days of Wrath, plus a Mexican TV series, Terminales.

Modeling 
Talancón has also posed for various lingerie and swimsuit ads such as Intimissimi, as well as the Gentlemen's Quarterly magazine.

Filmography 

El Sueño De Ivan (2011) 
La Venta Del Paraiso (2012)
Tercera Llamada (2013)
Enter The Dangerous Mind (2013)

Television
 Al norte del corazón (1997)
 Señora (1998)
 Romántica Obsesión (1999)
 Amor Latino (2000)
 Lo que callamos las mujeres (2001)
 Vale todo (2002)
 Tiempo Final (2004)
 Terminales (2008)
 Dollhouse (2009)
 Soy tu fan (2010)
 Covert Affairs (2012)
palabra de ladron (2014)
Top Chef Mexico Host- (2017)
El Recluso (2018)

References

External links 
 
 Ana Claudia Talancón ennetflix
 Ana Claudia Talancón Filmaffinity

1980 births
Living people
Mexican film actresses
Mexican television actresses
Mexican female models
Actresses from Quintana Roo
People from Cancún
21st-century Mexican actresses